Betaf, or Tena, is a Papuan language of Indonesia.

References

Languages of western New Guinea
Orya–Tor languages